Giannis Mystakidis (born 7 December 1994) is a Greek professional footballer who plays as a forward.

Career
Born in Thessaloniki, Mystakidis started his career in Germany playing for Regionalliga Südwest club SC Freiburg II. He first played professionally in the 2014–15 season with Pierikos. He can cover all three positions behind the forward, is not predictable in his playing and has good finishes in both short and long distance.

Mystakidis scored his first goal for PAOK in an unofficial match against Dnipro. On 16 July 2015, he made his debut with PAOK in an away loss game against Lokomotiva Zagreb for the second qualifying round of the UEFA Europa League.

He scored his first goal in 2015–16 season in a 3–1 away win against Kalloni. On 25 August 2016, PAOK extended the contract of the young striker till the summer 2020.

On 29 January 2017, he scored the only goal in a 1–0 Superleague Greece away win against Panetolikos. Two days later, he scored another goal in a 2–0 away win against AEL and a week after he scored 2–1 Greek Cup away win against Xanthi.

The 2016–17 season was an establishment year for the young striker, as he had gradually managed to gain the trust of Vladimir Ivić. On 2 April, in the 80th minute of the match against AEL for the 26th day of the Superleague Greece, the 23-year-old ace was forced to request an immediate change after an attempt to avert a throw-out. A day later, Mystakidis had a surgery, faced a cruciate ligament rupture that probably kept him out of the team for six months. On 19 December 2017, he made his return to competitive football, coming on in the 82nd minute during the club's 5–1 Greek Cup away win against Trikala. His first appearance came 260 days after the knee injury. He almost scored too, as a firm header was turned aside by the Trikala goalkeeper. Mystakidis received a cut to the right eyebrow after a collision with an opposing player.

On 31 January 2018, he signed a six-month contract with rivals Panathinaikos on loan from PAOK, until the end of the 2017–18 season without a purchase option.

On 20 August 2018, he signed a long season contract with PAS Giannina on loan from PAOK, until the end of the 2018–19 season without a purchase option. The loan contract was terminated on 4 January 2019, six months before it was due to expire. On 2 February 2019, he joined Polish club Górnik Zabrze on a six months loan from PAOK.

On 30 June 2019, it was confirmed that Mystakidis would spend the 2019–20 season on loan at Volos.

On 14 January 2020, he signed a contract with Eerste Divisie club De Graafschap until July 2020.

Career statistics

Honours
PAOK

Greek Cup: 2016–17, 2017–18

References

External links

1994 births
Living people
Greek footballers
Greek expatriate footballers
Greece under-21 international footballers
Greece youth international footballers
Super League Greece players
Super League Greece 2 players
Ekstraklasa players
Eerste Divisie players
SC Freiburg players
PAOK FC players
Pierikos F.C. players
PAS Giannina F.C. players
Górnik Zabrze players
Volos N.F.C. players
Veria NFC players
De Graafschap players
Xanthi F.C. players
Panserraikos F.C. players
Expatriate footballers in Poland
Expatriate footballers in the Netherlands
Association football wingers
Association football forwards
Footballers from Thessaloniki